The Surabaya metropolitan area, or known locally as Gerbangkertosusila (from Gresik-Bangkalan-Mojokerto-Surabaya-Sidoarjo-Lamongan), is a metropolitan area in East Java, Indonesia. It is the country's second-largest metropolitan area, after Jakarta metropolitan area.

Definition

Grebangkertosusila is an official acronym of "Gresik Bangkalan Mojokerto Surabaya Sidoarjo Lamongan", a main metropolitan or planning area in East Java consisting of the seven cities and regencies with those names (Mojokerto is both a city and a regency). It has an area of 5,925.843 km2, and at the 2020 Census had a population of 9,924,509.

The national government regards the Surabaya Metropolitan Area as including only Surabaya, Sidoarjo Regency, and Gresik Regency, known as "Zona Surabaya Raya".  Gresik Regency includes Bawean Island, covering some 196 km2 and lying north of Java; however Bawean Island is excluded from the Metropolitan Area.

Surabaya traditionally constituted Indonesia's second-largest metropolitan area, after Jakarta, but fast growing Bandung Metropolitan Area (in West Java) is since 2005 more populous.  However, the extended metropolitan area of Surabaya is second in Indonesia only to Jabodetabek. The areas and populations at the 2010 Census, the 2020 Census and according to the official estimates for mid 2021, are shown below for the component parts of the metropolitan area.

Note: (a) The island of Bawean, while part of Gresik Regency, is not technically part of the Metropolitan area; nevertheless for convenience the figures given here include Bawean.

 Reference: Statistics Indonesia

Transportation

Surabaya metropolitan area has air connection via Juanda International Airport.

Surabaya metropolitan area has five commuter rail services with the network similar with KRL Commuterline in Jakarta metropolitan area. The services connects Surabaya city center to the neighboring cities and regency in the area.

The Suroboyo Bus city bus is serving Surabaya, using plastic waste as a form of payment. Eversince May 2022, however, direct payment using plastic bottles on the bus has been terminated and plastic waste has to be exchanged in designated points beforehand.

See also
 List of metropolitan areas by population

References

 Mera, Koichi and Renaud, Bertrand (2001). Asia's Financial Crisis and the Role of Real Estate. M.E. Sharpe. 

Geography of East Java
Metropolitan areas of Indonesia